This is a list of towns, villages and most notable hamlets and neighbourhoods in the ceremonial county of Essex (not the historic county).

A
Abberton
Abbess Roding
Abridge
Aldham
Alphamstone
Alresford
Althorne
Ardleigh
Arkesden
Ashdon
Asheldham
Ashen
Ashingdon
Audley End
Aythorpe Roding

B
Bardfield Saling
Barnston
Barrow Hill
Basildon
Battlesbridge
Beauchamp Roding
Beaumont
Belchamp Otten
Belchamp St Paul
Belchamp Walter
North Benfleet
South Benfleet
Berden
Berners Roding
Bicknacre
Billericay
Birch
Birchanger
Birdbrook
Blackmore
Black Notley
Bobbingworth
Bocking
Boreham
Borley
Boxted
Bradfield
Bradwell-on-Sea
Bradwell Waterside
Braintree
Brentwood
Brightlingsea
Broomfield
Broxted
Buckhurst Hill
Bulmer
Bulphan
Bures Hamlet
Bures St Mary
Burnham-on-Crouch

C
Canvey Island
Castle Hedingham
Chadwell St Mary
Chafford Hundred
Chelmsford (the county town)
Chignall Smealy
Chigwell
Childerditch
Chipping Ongar
Chrishall
Clacton-on-Sea
Clavering
Coggeshall
Colchester (the home of the University of Essex)
Cold Norton
Colne Engaine
Corringham
Cressing

D
Debden, Epping Forest
Debden, Uttlesford
Dedham
Dengie
Doddinghurst
Dovercourt
Downham
Drapers Green
Duddenhoe End

E
Earls Colne
Eastend
East Hanningfield
East Horndon
East Mersea
East Tilbury
Elmdon
Elmstead Market
Elsenham
Epping

F
Farnham
Faulkbourne
Feering
Felsted
Finchingfield
Fingringhoe
Flitch Green
Foulness Island
Foxearth
Frating
Frinton-on-Sea
Fryerning
Fyfield

G
Galleywood
Gosfield
Grays
Great Baddow
Great Bardfield
Great Bentley
Great Bromley
Great Dunmow
Great Horkesley
Great Maplestead
Great Leighs
Great Notley
Great Oakley
Great Saling
Great Totham
Great Wakering
Great Warley
Great Yeldham

H
Hadleigh
Hadstock
Halstead
Harlow
Harwich
Hatfield Peverel
Hawkwell
Helions Bumpstead
Henham
Herongate
Heybridge
High Beach
High Easter
High Laver
High Ongar
Hockley
Horndon on the Hill
Horsley Cross
Horsleycross Street
Howe Green
Hullbridge
Hutton

I
Ingatestone
Ingrave

K
Kelvedon
Kelvedon Hatch
Kirby-le-Soken

L
Lambourne
Langenhoe
Langley
Latchingdon
Lawford
Layer de la Haye
Leaden Roding
Leigh-on-Sea
Lexden
Liston
Little Baddow
Little Bentley
Little Bromley
Little Dunmow
Little Horkesley
Little Maplestead
Little Totham
Little Warley
Loughton

M
Maldon
Manningtree
Margaretting
Marks Tey
Mashbury
Matching Tye
Messing
Mistley
Mount Bures
Mountnessing
Mundon

N
Navestock
Newport
North Benfleet
North Fambridge
Northey Island
North Shoebury
North Weald Bassett
Nounsley

O

Oakwood Park
Old Heath
Orsett
Osea Island
Ostend
Ovington

P
Pale Green
Parkeston
Pebmarsh
Pentlow
Pilgrims Hatch
Pitsea
Pleshey
Potton Island
Prittlewell

Q
Quendon

R
Ramsey
Rawreth
Rayleigh
Rayne
Rettendon
Ridgewell
Rochford
Rowhedge
Roxwell
Roydon
Runwell

S
Saffron Walden
Sandon
Sewards End
Shelley
Shellow Bowells
Shenfield
Shoeburyness
Sible Hedingham
Silver End
South Benfleet

South Fambridge
Southend-on-Sea
Southminster
South Ockendon
South Woodham Ferrers
St Lawrence Bay
St. Osyth
Stanford-le-Hope
Stansted Mountfitchet
Stanway
Stambourne
Stapleford Abbotts
Steeple Bumpstead
Stebbing
Stisted
Stock
Stondon Massey
Stow Maries
Sturmer

T
Takeley
Tendring
Terling
Thorpe-le-Soken
Thaxted
Theydon Bois
Thorrington
Thundersley
Thurrock
Tilbury
Tilbury Juxta Clare
Tiptree
Tollesbury
 Tolleshunt D’Arcy 
Tolleshunt Knights
Toot Hill
Toppesfield
Two Tree Island

U
 Ugley
 Ugley Green

V
Vange
Virley

W
Wallasea Island
Waltham Abbey
Walton-on-the-Naze
Warley
West Bergholt
Westcliff-on-Sea
West Hanningfield
West Horndon
West Mersea
West Tilbury
Wethersfield
White Colne
White Court
White Notley
Wicken Bonhunt
Wickford
Wickham Bishops
Wickham St Pauls
Wiggens Green
Wimbish
Witham
Wivenhoe
Wix
Woodham Ferrers
Woodlands Park
Wormingford
Wrabness
Writtle
Wyatts Green

Y
Young's End

See also
List of civil parishes in Essex
List of settlements in Essex by population
List of places in England

 
Essex
Places